Emanuel Carrette (born May 24, 1948), is a former Brazilian soccer player who played in the NASL.

Career statistics

Club

Notes

References

Living people
Brazilian footballers
Brazilian expatriate footballers
Association football forwards
CR Flamengo footballers
Desportiva Ferroviária players
Ceará Sporting Club players
New York Cosmos players
Denver Dynamos players
Campeonato Brasileiro Série A players
North American Soccer League (1968–1984) players
Expatriate soccer players in the United States
Brazilian expatriate sportspeople in the United States
1948 births